Syed Azhar Saeed (born 25 December 1970) is a former Pakistani-born cricketer who played for the United Arab Emirates national cricket team. Azhar Saeed played five first-class cricket games for Lahore City Whites and Lahore City from 1984–85 to 1987–88 before later emigrating to the Emirates, which he first represented in the 1994 ICC Trophy, where he was named joint man-of-the-tournament.

Azhar Saeed is an all-rounder who opened the UAE batting. He played seven One Day Internationals for the UAE in the 1993–94 Pepsi Austral-Asia Cup and 1996 Cricket World Cup. His final international appearances were in the 1997 ICC Trophy.

References

External links
 

1970 births
Living people
Pakistani cricketers
Emirati cricketers
United Arab Emirates One Day International cricketers
Pakistani emigrants to the United Arab Emirates
Pakistani expatriate sportspeople in the United Arab Emirates
Cricketers from Lahore
Lahore City cricketers
Lahore City Whites cricketers